Eden Massouema (born 29 June 1997) is a French professional footballer who plays as a midfielder for  club Paris 13 Atletico.

Club career
Massouema arrived at Paris FC in the summer of 2015. He made his professional debut for the club in a 1–1 tie with Red Star on 9 August 2016.

After a successful debut season, Massouema transferred to Dijon in Ligue 1 on 12 June 2017. He made his professional debut for the club in an 8–0 Ligue 1 loss to Paris Saint-Germain on 17 January 2018, coming on as a late sub in the 61st minute.

On 29 December 2021, Massouema signed for Championnat National 2 side Paris 13 Atletico.

International career
Born in France, Massouema has been called up to the Congo national team.

Career statistics

References

External links
 
 Sofoot Profile
 

Living people
1999 births
People from Villepinte, Seine-Saint-Denis
Footballers from Seine-Saint-Denis
Association football midfielders
French footballers
French sportspeople of Republic of the Congo descent
Paris FC players
Dijon FCO players
Valenciennes FC players
ES Troyes AC players
Paris 13 Atletico players
Championnat National 2 players
Championnat National 3 players
Championnat National players
Ligue 1 players
Ligue 2 players
Black French sportspeople